The 2000–01 Elitserien was the 67th season of the top division of Swedish handball. 12 teams competed in the league. The league was split into an autumn league and a spring league. The eight highest placed teams in the autumn league qualified for the spring league, whereas the four lowest placed teams qualified for Allsvenskan along with the highest placed teams from the autumn season of Division I (the second level). The six highest placed teams in the spring season of Elitserien qualified for the quarterfinals, whereas the two lowest placed teams qualified for the preliminary round of the playoffs, along with the two highest placed teams of Allsvenskan. Redbergslids IK won the regular season and also won the playoffs to claim their 19th Swedish title.

League tables

Autumn

Spring

Playoffs

First round

 Tumba–Skövde 19–28  
 Skövde–Tumba 22–26
Skövde won 50–45 on aggregate

 Sävehof–Lugi 29–19
 Lugi–Sävehof 20–13 
Sävehof won 42–39 on aggregate

Quarterfinals

 Redbergslid–H 43 21–20  
 H 43–Redbergslid 11–21  
Redbergslid won series 2–0

 Drott–Alingsås 25–12
 Alingsås–Drott 20–25
Drott won series 2–0

 Guif–Sävehof 21–18  
 Sävehof–Guif 18–20  
Guif won series 2–0

 IFK Ystad–Skövde 22–24
 Skövde–IFK Ystad 28–26  
Skövde won series 2–0

Semifinals

 Drott–Guif 24–28  
 Guif–Drott 23–21  
Guif won series 2–0

 Redbergslid–Skövde 25–27
 Skövde–Redbergslid 16–20
 Redbergslid–Skövde 27–24
Redbergslid won series 2–1

Finals

 Redbergslid–Guif 25–19
 Guif–Redbergslid 27–26
 Redbergslid–Guif 25–21
Redbergslid won series 2–1

References 

Swedish handball competitions